Catharina Felicia van Rees (22 August 1831-1 April 1915) was an author, editor, and composer. She wrote novels about the lives of composers and edited a collection of "Dutch Authoresses" to use the language of the time. She wrote her novels under the pseudonym Celéstine. She favored the education of Dutch women and for women to show their talents "into the light and let it shine forth." That stated the Dutch aspect of this was important to her as well and she was willing to include male writers if not enough Dutch women writers were available. She is also of some interest in the History of South Africa as she wrote the National anthem of the Transvaal.

References 

1831 births
1915 deaths
19th-century Dutch women writers
20th-century Dutch women writers
Dutch editors
Dutch women classical composers
Dutch classical composers
Dutch feminists
People from Zutphen